The Missouri Mountain Shale is a Silurian geologic formation in the Ouachita Mountains of Arkansas and Oklahoma. First described in 1892, this unit was not named until 1909 by Albert Homer Purdue in his study of the Ouachita Mountains of Arkansas.  Purdue assigned the Missouri Mountains in Polk and Montgomery counties, Arkansas as the type locality, but did not designate a stratotype. As of 2017, a reference section for this unit has yet to be designated.

See also

 List of fossiliferous stratigraphic units in Arkansas
 Paleontology in Arkansas

References

Silurian Arkansas
Silurian geology of Oklahoma